Shaanxi Television, also known as SXTV, is a Chinese television network based in Xi'an, Shaanxi Province, China.

See also
:zh:陕西广播电视台

External links
Official Site 

Television networks in China
Television channels and stations established in 1960
Mass media in Xi'an